Leptolalax applebyi (Appleby's Asian toad) is a species of frog in the family Megophryidae. It is endemic to Vietnam where it is only known from near its type locality, Song Thanh Nature Reserve, Phước Sơn District in Quảng Nam Province of central Vietnam.

Leptolalax applebyi is a montane species found near streams. It is a small species even among generally small Leptolalax: five adult males were recorded to measure  in snout-vent length and a single female  SVL.

References

applebyi
Amphibians of Vietnam
Endemic fauna of Vietnam
Amphibians described in 2009